North Walsham High School is a co-educational secondary school located in North Walsham in the English county of Norfolk. On the same site there is the shared-use Atrium Arts Centre.

History
The school gained specialist status as an Arts College in 2005. A redevelopment of North Walsham High School, including the opening of a new enterprise centre was completed in summer 2012.

Neil Powell was appointed as headteacher in September 2016 and aimed that "Within the next three years, North Walsham High School will be rated as an “outstanding” school with students achieving excellent GCSE results."

Ofsted visited in late 2018 and the report downgraded the school to 'requiring improvement.' It was critical of legacy issues and governance, noting that the view of school leaders was at odds with those of inspectors. In 2018, 61% of Y11 students achieved a pass grade of 4 or above in English and Maths.

Previously a community school administered by Norfolk County Council, in October 2019 North Walsham High School converted to academy status and is now sponsored by the Enrich Learning Trust.

In June 2020, during the Coronavirus lockdown a new head was appointed. Mr James Gosden, on appointment, made a far less ambitious pledge: 'to return the school’s Ofsted rating to “good” '.

Academics
Ofsted described this as a smaller than average secondary school serving rural North Norfolk. The parents of the overwhelmingly White British students are deeply resistant to change. The proportion of pupils eligible for the pupil premiumis broadly average. The proportion of pupils with Special educational needs (SEND), including those with an education, health and care plan, is above average.

Virtually all maintained schools and academies follow the National Curriculum, and are inspected by Ofsted on how well they succeed in delivering a 'broad and balanced curriculum'. The school has to decide whether Key Stage 3 contains years 7, 8 and 9- or whether Key Stage 3 should be compressed into 2 years and year 9 should be in Key Stage 4 so the students just study subjects that will be examined by the GCSE exams at 16. North Walsham, and rural Norfolk, has difficulty in attracting teachers and retaining them, so there is a lot of turbulence. It is making the changes demanded by a bad Ofsted report, and in the process has become an academy. The new trust now says "Our curriculum is highly personalised and evolves each term to target the needs of all students." They expect that all future students will do exams in four option subjects alongside a core of Maths, English and Science. They have moved to a compressed Key Stage 3 with a three year Key Stage 4.

The Zones
Ever since the covid-19 precautions were put in place in the UK North Walsham high school implemented a "zone" system where all 5 of the years were split into separate areas of the field where students spend their free time at lunch and break.

The Atrium
The Atrium is a £5.3m arts and education centre which opened in September 2011. Facilities at the Atrium include a theatre, cinema, classrooms, exhibition spaces, rooms for meetings, dance studio for various classes, large carpeted areas for workshops and an auditorium that seats 186 people.

The facilities at the Atrium are used primarily by North Walsham High School during the school day, but are open to the wider community of North Walsham and North Norfolk at other times.

References

External links
North Walsham High School official website
The Atrium official website

Secondary schools in Norfolk
Academies in Norfolk
North Walsham